Peter Otto Steiner (July 9, 1922 – June 26, 2010) was a noted economist and Professor Emeritus of Economics at the University of Michigan. His research was on a wide range of topics and he published several books including (with Richard G. Lipsey) a standard textbook, and on the Economic Status of the Aged   (Jointly with Robert Dorfman) but is perhaps best remembered for his work, also jointly with Dorfman, on advertising. The Dorfman–Steiner theorem carries his name. He also served as president of the American Association of University Professors (AAUP).

Selected publications

Books

Journal articles

References

External links

1922 births
2010 deaths
American economists
University of Michigan faculty
Presidents of the American Association of University Professors